Geoffrey Demont (born 19 March 1991 in Saint-Germain-en-Laye) is a professional squash player who represented France. He reached a career-high world ranking of World No. 82 in November 2016.

References

External links 
 
 
 

1991 births
Living people
French male squash players
21st-century French people